Little Lulu is a comic strip created in 1935 by American author Marjorie Henderson Buell. The character, Lulu Moppet, debuted in The Saturday Evening Post on February 23, 1935, in a single panel, appearing as a flower girl at a wedding and mischievously strewing the aisle with banana peels. Little Lulu replaced Carl Anderson's Henry, which had been picked up for distribution by King Features Syndicate. The Little Lulu panel continued to run weekly in The Saturday Evening Post until December 30, 1944. A later variation of the character is Little Audrey  from Harveytoons.

Little Lulu was created as a result of Anderson's success. Schlesinger Library curator Kathryn Allamong Jacob wrote: 
Lulu was born in 1935, when The Saturday Evening Post asked Buell to create a successor to the magazine’s Henry, Carl Anderson’s stout, mute little boy, who was moving on to national syndication. The result was Little Lulu, the resourceful, equally silent (at first) little girl whose loopy curls were reminiscent of the artist’s own as a girl. Buell explained to a reporter, "I wanted a girl because a girl could get away with more fresh stunts that in a small boy would seem boorish".

History

Marjorie Henderson Buell (1904–1993), whose work appeared under the pen name "Marge", had created two comic strips in the 1920s: The Boy Friend and Dashing Dot, both with female leads.  She first had Little Lulu published as a single-panel cartoon in The Saturday Evening Post on February 23, 1935. The single-panel strip continued in the Post until the December 30, 1944 issue, and continued from then as a regular comic strip. Buell herself ceased drawing the comic strip in 1947. In 1950, Little Lulu became a daily syndicated series by Chicago Tribune–New York News Syndicate, and ran until 1969.

Comic-book stories of the character scripted by John Stanley appeared in ten issues of Dell's Four Color before a Marge's Little Lulu series appeared in 1948 with scripts and layouts by Stanley and finished art by Irving Tripp and others.  Stanley greatly expanded the cast of characters and changed the name of Lulu's portly pal from "Joe" to "Tubby", a character that was popular enough himself to warrant a Marge's Tubby series that ran from 1952 to 1961. Little Lulu was widely merchandised, Writer/artist John Stanley's work on the Little Lulu comic book is highly regarded. He did the initial Lulu comics, later working with artists Irving Tripp and Charles Hedinger (Tripp inking Hedinger before eventually assuming both duties), writing and laying out the stories. 

He continued working on the comic until around 1959. Stanley is responsible for the many additional characters in the stories. After Stanley, other writers produced the Lulu stories for Gold Key Comics, including Arnold Drake. The comics were translated into French, Spanish, Japanese, Arabic, Portuguese, and other languages. After Buell's retirement in 1972 she signed the rights to Western Publishing. Marge's was dropped from the title, and the series continued until 1984.

Characters
The main characters of the Little Lulu comic strip include the following. Full details and supporting and minor characters can be found in the main article of Little Lulu characters. Variations from the comic strip and other media representations are discussed in the main article.

 Little Lulu – Louise "Little Lulu" Moppet is the main character and Tubby and Annie's best friend. She is very smart, but stubborn and always initiates a battle with the boys to show that the girls are as good as them. Lulu is also very creative and tells stories to Alvin to teach him a lesson with fun. She wears a red dress and hat and has long black curly hair with brown highlights.
 Tubby Tompkins – Thomas "Tubby" Tompkins is Lulu's male best friend and her chief opponent in their disputes. He is the leader of the boys' club known as "The Fellers". He is relapsed and always forgets to pay the monthly fee or to fulfill the obligations and his clubmates often take him out of office. He is in love with Gloria, but she rarely given him a chance, although he never stops trying to win her heart. He has red hair and wears a white sailor's hat, a black collared shirt and light brown/orange pants, making his outfit very similar to a sailor's uniform. See main article: Tubby Tompkins.
 Annie Inch – Lulu's female best friend who is involved in most of Lulu's escapades and adventures. She is not as smart, but she is a true friend who helps Lulu in her plans. Sometimes she is annoyed at everyone for no reason. Annie is Iggy's sister. She has short black straight hair and wears a blue dress (in the earlier years she wore a yellow dress).
 Iggy Inch – Tubby's male best friend and a member of the "Fellers". He is grumpy, mischievous and always doing tricks. Iggy is Annie's brother. He has a shaved head, and wears a white collar shirt and orange pants (in the early years, he wore an orange collared shirt and blue pants).
 Willie Wilkins – One of Tubby's friends and the strongest member of the "Fellers". He has short black hair and wears an orange cap, a green shirt, and orange knickers (in the early years, he wore a brown cap, a red shirt and gray knickers).
 Eddie Stimson – One of Tubby's friends and the smartest member of the "Fellers". He often creates the boys' plans against the West Side Boys.
 Wilbur Van Snobbe – The richest and most charming boy in town. He likes to be loved by the girls, but he is arrogant and petulant, being sweet only with Gloria. Wilbur has no friends, although he sometimes plays with the other kids. He has curly blond hair and wears a purple suit (in the early years, he had red hair and a blue suit). 
 Gloria ("Goode") Darling – The most beautiful girl in town. She is kind and playful with the girls, who adore her, and the boys, who fall in love with her. Gloria is a rival of Lulu's and she is richer than most of the class, although less than Wilbur. She has long, wavy blonde hair and wears a ruffled pink dress.
 Alvin Jones – Lulu's 6-year-old neighbor. He is mischievous, bratty and only stops tantrums when Lulu tells a story. He has red hair with a quiff and wears a white shirt and blue overalls.
 Martha and George Moppet – Lulu's parents. Martha is a great cook and George is always targeted by Tubby's pursuit as a detective.
 Ellie and Jim Tompkins – Tubby's parents.
 The West Side Boys – A gang of stronger, tougher bully boys from across town who are the rival club of the "Fellers" and always try to invade their club. The most frequently seen of the West Side Boys are Butch (the leader), Mickey and Spike, while other individual members include Mike, Slug, Junior and Guggy.

Comic strips and comic books

A daily comic strip, entitled Little Lulu, was syndicated by the Chicago Tribune-New York News Syndicate from June 5, 1950, through May 31, 1969. Artists included Woody Kimbrell (1950–1964), Roger Armstrong (1964–1966), and Ed Nofziger (1966–1969).

Little Lulu appeared in ten issues of Dell Comics' Four Color comic book series (#74, 97, 110, 115, 120, 131, 139, 146, 158, 165), before graduating to her own title: Marge's Little Lulu in 1948.

With the Dell Comics/Western Publishing split that created Gold Key Comics, Little Lulu went to Gold Key with issue No. 165. Tubby got his own comic series from 1952 to 1961, first appearing in Four Color No. 381, 430, 444, and #461; then his own title Marge's Tubby from No. 5 thru 49. In this series, Tubby had his own adventures without Lulu, especially with the Little Men from Mars.

Upon retirement, Marge sold Little Lulu to Western Publishing. The comic was re–named Little Lulu with No. 207 (September 1972). Publication of the comics ceased in 1984 (with issue No. 268, the last few under the Whitman Comics name), when Western discontinued publishing comics. Artist Hy Eisman retained stories intended for #269–270 (scripted by Paul Kuhn) because the artwork was returned to him after the comic was cancelled. Three of these are to be reprinted in the Lulu fanzine The HoLLywood Eclectern (HE). "The Case of the Disappearing Tutu", slated to be the lead story in Little Lulu No. 270, appears in HE No. 47 (2008).

There were also two giant-sized Annuals (#1–2, 1953–1954), 14 Dell Giants (with seasonal and other themes), a regular-sized unnumbered special on visiting Japan and three Gold Key Specials (two with Lulu on Halloween and summer camp and one with Tubby and the Little Men from Mars). Lulu also appeared in 20 issues of March of Comics and was reprinted in several Golden Comics Digests.

Between 1985 and 1992 Another Rainbow Publishing published a hardbound 18-volume set, the Little Lulu Library, collecting the stories in the Four Color issues, plus the regular series through No. 87.

While Western Publishing's Little Lulu stopped being released in 1984, in Brazil new Lulu stories, penned by local artists, kept being published by Editora Abril. Primaggio Mantovi was responsible for overseeing the production. Luluzinha, Abril's main monthly Lulu comic series, ended in 1993.

Advertising and merchandising
Little Lulu was featured on numerous licensed products, and she was the centerpiece of an extensive advertising campaign for Kleenex tissues during the 1940s–50s,  being the first mascot for Kleenex tissues; from 1952 to 1965 the character appeared in an elaborate animated billboard in Times Square in New York City. and she was also seen in Pepsi-Cola magazine ads during that period. Kleenex commercials featuring Little Lulu were regularly seen in the 1950s on Perry Como's TV show. Buell (the comics' creator) played an active role in merchandising Little Lulu, often taking a hands-on role in terms and negotiations. Currently, the trademarks on Little Lulu are held by NBCUniversal (which manages the properties of DreamWorks Classics, as well as its parent company, DreamWorks Animation).

Adaptations

Short films

Between 1943 and 1948, Lulu appeared in 26 theatrical animated shorts produced by Famous Studios for Paramount Pictures, replacing the Superman shorts of the 1940s. Paramount went on to create a similar character, Little Audrey, after failing to renew the Lulu license (and therefore avoiding the payment of royalty fees). 

Lulu was voiced by Cecil Roy, while Tubby was voiced by Arnold Stang. The theme song for the shorts was written and composed by Buddy Kaye, Fred Wise, and Sidney Lippman, and performed by the singing group Helen Carroll and the Satisfiers. All musical arrangements were done by Winston Sharples and Sammy Timberg. 

List of Little Lulu cartoons

Some of the shorts listed below were released into the public domain, and are marked with an asterisk (*) in the original release date column.

In the 1960s, Paramount and Famous Studios produced two new Little Lulu cartoons, "Alvin's Solo Flight" (a Noveltoon cartoon), and "Frog's Legs" (a Comic Kings cartoon), both based on two of John Stanley's comic stories. Cecil Roy reprised her role as Lulu, but Arnold Stang did not return as Tubby, as by that time, he already left Famous Studios to work at Hanna-Barbera Productions where he would perform the voices for Top Cat.

Feature films 
ABC aired two half-hour live-action specials based on the comic on Saturday morning as part of ABC Weekend Special. Little Lulu was released on November 4, 1978 and The Big Hex of Little Lulu on September 15, 1979. The cast included: 

 Lauri Hendler as Lulu
 Kevin King Cooper as Tubby
 Lulu Baxter as Annie
 Robbie Rist as Iggy
 Annrae Walterhouse as Gloria
 Billy 'Pop' Atmore as Willie
 Nicky Manfredi as Eddie 
 Billy Jayne as Alvin
 Nita DiGiampaolo as Margie
 Shari Belafonte as Janie

Television adaptations 
Little Lulu was adapted for the Japanese TV series Ritoru Ruru to Chitchai Nakama (Little Lulu and Her Little Friends), was directed by Seitaro Kodama, produced by the Japanese studio Nippon Animation and written by Niisan Takahashi. the TV series was issued in Japan by ABC and NET. Lulu was interpreted by Eiko Masuyama in the first 3 episodes and Minori Matsushima for the remainder, Keiko Yamamoto interpreted to Tubby Tompkins, Alvin was performed by Sachiko Chichimatsu and Annie and Iggy Inch were performed by Junko Hori and Yoneko Matsukane respectively. The music was composed by Nobuyoshi Koshibe, The main theme in the original language was composed by and the end theme "Watashi wa Lulu" (I am Lulu) was composed only by Mitsuko Horie. An English-dubbed version of the anime was made for the American market by ZIV International in 1978, this same company distributed globally the TV series, the show lasted from 1976 to 1977 with 26 episodes in total.

In 1995, Little Lulu was adapted for The Little Lulu Show, an HBO animated series with the voices of Tracey Ullman (Season 1) and Jane Woods (Seasons 2–3) as Lulu Moppet. The series was produced by the America's CINAR (now WildBrain) after Marge's death in 1993. The series ended in 1998, but continued to air on Family Channel and as formerly seen on Teletoon Retro in the United States.

Manga-style Brazilian comic
In 2009 Luluzinha Teen e sua Turma (English: Teen Little Lulu and her Gang), a Brazilian comic book series depicting Lulu and her friends as teenagers, was launched. The book was created in an attempt to rival Monica Adventures, another comic book which also adapts a popular franchise (in this case, Brazilian Monica's Gang) by using a manga style and presenting its original characters now as teenagers.

Lulu and Tubby have their first kiss in #50, a commemorative edition.

Luluzinha Teen e sua Turma became very popular in its introduction, being one of the best-selling comics in Brazil for a while, second only to its "rival". Nevertheless, unlike Monica Adventures (which is still being published), Little Lulu's teen spin-off was canceled in 2015, after 65 issues.

Later days
Lulu fans hold an annual gathering at the San Diego Comic Con in which they perform a play adapted from a classic Lulu story.

Reprints

The Little Lulu Library

Published by Another Rainbow Publishing, were a series of six-book box sets released from 1985 to 1992. They were published in reverse order, with Set VI being released first, then counting down to Set I. Each of the six sets contains three volumes, each with about six comics. The comics are printed in black and white; however, the covers are printed in full color. The books are about 9" by 12", with the pages being larger than the original comic book pages.

Dark Horse reprints
In 2004, Dark Horse Comics obtained the rights to reprint Little Lulu comics. 18 black and white volumes, plus an unnumbered color special, were published through early 2008. After a short hiatus, the series resumed in mid-2009 in full color. Volumes 4 and 5 were originally published before the first three volumes, as it was felt that their content was more accessible.

My Dinner with Lulu  (reprints Four Color Comics No. 74, 97, 110, 115, 120)
Sunday Afternoon  (reprints Four Color Comics No. 131, 139, 146, 158)
Lulu in the Doghouse  (reprints Four Color Comics No. 165 and Little Lulu #1–5)
Lulu Goes Shopping  (reprints Little Lulu #6–12)
Lulu Takes a Trip  (reprints Little Lulu #13–17)
Letters to Santa  (reprints Little Lulu #18–22)
Lulu's Umbrella Service  (reprints Little Lulu #23–27)
Late for School  (reprints Little Lulu #28–32)
Lucky Lulu  (reprints Little Lulu #33–37)
All Dressed Up  (reprints Little Lulu #38–42)
April Fools  (reprints Little Lulu #43–48)
Leave It to Lulu  (reprints Little Lulu #49–53)
Too Much Fun  (reprints Little Lulu #54–58)
Queen Lulu  (reprints Little Lulu #59–63)
The Explorers  (reprints Little Lulu #64–68)
A Handy Kid  (reprints Little Lulu #69–74)
The Valentine  (reprints Little Lulu #75–81)
The Expert  (reprints Little Lulu #82–87)
The Alamo and Other Stories  (reprints Little Lulu #88–93 in full color)
The Bawlplayers and Other Stories  (reprints Little Lulu #94–99 in full color)
Miss Feeny's Folly and Other Stories  (reprints Little Lulu #100–105 in full color)
The Big Dipper Club and Other Stories  (reprints Little Lulu #106–111 in full color)
The Bogey Snowman and Other Stories  (reprints Little Lulu #112–117 in full color)
The Space Dolly and Other Stories  (reprints Little Lulu #118–123 in full color)
The Burglar-Proof Clubhouse and Other Stories  (reprints Little Lulu #124–129 in full color)
The Feud and Other Stories  (reprints Little Lulu #130–135 in full color)
The Treasure Map and Other Stories  (reprints Dell Giant/Marge's Little Lulu and her Special Friends No. 3 and Dell Giant/Marge's Little Lulu and her Friends No. 4 in full color)
The Prize Winner and Other Stories  (reprints Dell Giant/Marge's Little Lulu and Tubby at Summer Camp No. 5 and Dell Giant/Marge's Little Lulu and Tubby Halloween Fun No. 6 in full color)
The Cranky Giant and Other Stories  (reprints Dell Giant/Marge's Little Lulu and Tubby at Summer Camp No. 2 and Dell Giant/Marge's Lulu and Tubby Halloween Fun No. 2 in full color)

Little Lulu Color Special  (reprints a selection of stories from Little Lulu No. 4 through No. 86 in full color)

Dark Horse later began issuing Giant Size volumes; each collects three of their reprint books.

Giant Size Little Lulu Volume 1  (reprints Four Color Comics No. 74, 97, 110, 115, 120, 131, 139, 146, 158, 165 and Little Lulu #1–5)
Giant Size Little Lulu Volume 2  (reprints Little Lulu #6–22)
Giant Size Little Lulu Volume 3  (reprints Little Lulu #23–37)
Giant Size Little Lulu Volume 4  (reprints Little Lulu #38–53)

In 2010, Dark Horse reprinted the companion Tubby series (Little Lulu's Pal Tubby) in volumes similar to their Lulu volumes.

The Castaway and Other Stories  (reprints Four Color Comics No. 381, 430, 444, 461 and Tubby #5–6 in full color)
The Runaway Statue and Other Stories  (reprints Tubby #7–12 in full color)
The Frog Boy and Other Stories  (reprints Tubby #13–18 in full color)
The Atomic Violin and Other Stories  (reprints Tubby #19–24 in full color)

Drawn & Quarterly reprints
In May 2018, Drawn & Quarterly announced that they will be reprinting John Stanley's Little Lulu comics in a multi-volume best-of series, beginning in spring 2019. Drawn & Quarterly reprinted a selection of John Stanley's stories for Free Comic Book Day 2019.

 Marge's Little Lulu in World's Best Comic Book  (reprints a selection of stories from John Stanley's tenure on Little Lulu in full color for Free Comic Book Day 2019)
 Little Lulu: Working Girl (November 2019), ISBN 
 Little Lulu: The Fuzzythingus Poopi (September 2020), ISBN 
 Little Lulu: The Little Girl Who Could Talk To Trees (December 2021), 

In 2009, Drawn & Quarterly printed a volume of John Stanley Tubby comics as part of their John Stanley Library series.

 Tubby: The John Stanley Library ISBN  (reprints the comic material from Tubby #9–12, designed by Seth)

In popular culture 
As a cameo appearance, Little Lulu was planned for the 1988 film Who Framed Roger Rabbit, but rights to the character could not be obtained in time. In 1994, an organization called Friends of Lulu was founded that lasted until 2011, its name was based on Little Lulu. In 2006, Buell's family donated a collection of Buell's artwork and related papers as Marge Papers to the Schlesinger Library on the History of Women in America. She finally makes a cameo appearing on a comic cover in The Simpsons episode "Husbands and Knives" (2007), being read by Alan Moore.

In Brazil, the expression for "boys' club" (an environment that excludes women) is "clube do Bolinha" (meaning "Tubby's club").

See also
 Little Lulu and Her Little Friends
 The Little Lulu Show
 Friends of Lulu, a US organization promoting participation of women in the comic book industry

References

Works cited

 
 
 
Strickler, Dave. Syndicated Comic Strips and Artists, 1924–1995: The Complete Index. Cambria, California: Comics Access, 1995. 
Taylhardat, Karim. The little lulu (La grumete huérfana; ensayo, Ediciones Sinsentido, Madrid, 2007)

Further reading
Michelle Ann Abate. "From Battling Adult Authority to Battling the Opposite Sex: Little Lulu as Gag Panel and Comic Book". Chapter 3 in Funny Girls: Guffaws, Guts, and Gender in Classic American Comics. Jackson MS: University of Mississippi Press, 2019. pp. 63–89.

Craig Shutt. "Little Lulu, Big Media Star." Hogan's Alley no.15 (2007), pp. 32–43.

External links
 Collection of mid-twentieth century advertising featuring Little Lulu from The TJS Labs Gallery of Graphic Design.
 Shaenon K. Garrity muses on the Little Lulu reprint project
 Little Lulu (character) at Don Markstein's Toonopedia. Archived from the original on November 11, 2015.
 
 
 
 Mark Evanier on Little Lulu being replaced by Little Audrey by Famous Studios, pt.1
 Mark Evanier on Little Lulu being replaced by Little Audrey by Famous Studios, pt.2
 Little Lulu (1940s) model sheets

 
1935 comics debuts
1944 comics endings
1950 comics debuts
1969 comics endings
American comics
American comic strips
American comics characters
Animated human characters
Child characters in animated films
Child characters in comics
Comics about women
Comics adapted into animated series
Comics adapted into television series
Comics characters introduced in 1935
Dell Comics characters
DreamWorks Classics
Famous Studios series and characters
Female characters in animation
Female characters in comics
Film series introduced in 1943
Humor comics
Gag-a-day comics
Gold Key Comics characters
Nippon Animation
Television series by U.M. & M. TV Corporation
Children's film series

pl:Mała Lulu